A steeplejack is a craftsman who scales buildings, chimneys, and church steeples to carry out repairs or maintenance. 

Steeplejacks erect ladders on church spires, industrial chimneys, cooling towers, bell towers, clock towers, or any other high structure. In the UK, steeplejacks now use a belay rope fall-arrest system (similar to the method used by rock climbers) attached to the ladders as they are erected to eliminate solo climbing and greatly reduce the risk of falls from height.

Once ladders have been erected, the next stage is usually to suspend a bosun's chair (a strong wooden plank on which the steeplejack can sit, pull themselves upwards or lower themselves downwards, or sit in a stationary position), but abseiling (UK) or rappelling (US) equipment is replacing the bosun's chair on many operations because of its lighter weight.

Once this has been done it is possible to use this access to begin building scaffolding to carry out any repairs which may be required. This is done by fixing anchors into the wall (whether concrete, stone, or brick) and "kicking" the scaffolding off from there.

It is also possible to carry out repairs from "suspended access cradles". These are the same type of rig window cleaners use on skyscrapers. The cradle is suspended from four wires. Two of these run through an electric motor which can "climb" or "descend" the wire, and the other two run freely through a box which allows the cradle to travel upwards with no obstruction, but will stop it instantly if it starts to fall. These "suspended access cradles" are popularly called "swing stages" by their crews.

Steeplejacks are called upon to repair or replace masonry (brick, stone or concrete), carry out general carpentry or painting or roof repair, remove and clean and repair windows, as well as sandblasting and other masonry cleaning tasks.

In Ontario, Canada, many steeplejacks are represented by Local 598 of the OPCMIA union (Operative Plasterers and Cement Masons International Association of the United States and Canada), and are required to complete a five-year apprenticeship.

In the UK steeplejack companies may be members of the industry association ATLAS (Association of Technical Lightning and Access Specialists). Britain's most famous steeplejack was Fred Dibnah, who became a television presenter and celebrity as a result of his craft and personality.

Gallery

See also 
  – The scaffolding man in Japan.
 Fred Dibnah - England's most famous steeplejack.

References 

Installation, maintenance, and repair occupations